Wiener's theorem is any of several theorems named after Norbert Wiener:
Paley–Wiener theorem
Wiener's 1/ƒ theorem about functions with absolutely convergent Fourier series.
Wiener–Ikehara theorem
Wiener–Khinchin theorem
Wiener's tauberian theorem
Wiener–Wintner theorem